Mount Fitzsimmons is a peak standing between Mount Jackling and Mount Shideler in the northern group of the Rockefeller Mountains on Edward VII Peninsula, Antarctica. It was discovered on January 27, 1929, by members of the Byrd Antarctic Expedition on an exploratory flight to this area, and was named for Roy Fitzsimmons, physicist in charge of the Rockefeller Mountains seismic station for the United States Antarctic Service during November–December 1940.

References 

Mountains of King Edward VII Land